Guillotine is a 1924 German silent drama film directed by Guido Parish and starring Willy Fritsch, Marcella Albani and Hans Albers.

The film's sets were designed by the art director August Rinaldi.

Cast
 Willy Fritsch as Paul
 Marcella Albani as Marie und die Mutter
 Hans Albers as Gaston Brieux
 Andja Zimowa as Alice
 Leopold von Ledebur as Cartier, Bankier
 Eduard von Winterstein as Prokurist Laroche
 Georg John
 Bruno Ziener

References

Bibliography
 Hans-Michael Bock and Tim Bergfelder. The Concise Cinegraph: An Encyclopedia of German Cinema. Berghahn Books.

External links

1924 films
Films of the Weimar Republic
German silent feature films
German black-and-white films
German drama films
1924 drama films
Silent drama films
1920s German films
1920s German-language films